Al Shaab Village is one of the largest shopping malls in the emirate of Sharjah, UAE.

Located in Sheikh Khalid Bin Mohammed Al Qassimi Street in Al - Hazannah district of Sharjah Emirate, the combined exhibition style shopping mall is a part of Al-Shaab CSC Complex and includes more than 250 Shops.

Based on the total area which includes Skate gate ice skating rink, the largest ice skating rink in Sharjah.

Access to the Shopping mall is provided via Sheikh Khalid Bin Mohammed Al Qassimi Street which stretches from Sharjah towards Ajman.

Shopping malls in Sharjah